Mustafa Koray Avcı (born 19 May 1978) is a Turkish former footballer.

Career
Avcı was trained in the youth team of Kocaelispor and moved to Çaykur Rizespor. After five years in Rizespor, he was transferred to Beşiktaş by manager Rıza Çalımbay at the beginning of 2005. He has transferred to Manisaspor as part of a deal by two clubs to bring Filip Hološko to Beşiktaş.

Avcı's stay at Manisaspor was short lived however, as he transferred to Gençlerbirliği in July 2008.

In August 2009, he was moved to Kasımpaşa S.K.

Career statistics

International goals

Honours

Club
Beşiktaş
Turkish Cup: 2005–06, 2006–07
Turkish Super Cup: 2006

References

External links
 
 Profile at TFF.org

1979 births
Beşiktaş J.K. footballers
Kasımpaşa S.K. footballers
Çaykur Rizespor footballers
Şanlıurfaspor footballers
Living people
Turkish footballers
Turkey B international footballers
Turkey international footballers
Süper Lig players
Batman Petrolspor footballers
Sportspeople from İzmit
Association football midfielders
Association football defenders